Sergey Mozhaev (born 22 February 1988) is a Russian freestyle skier. He competed in ski cross at the World Ski Championships 2013, and at the 2014 Winter Olympics in Sochi, in ski-cross.

References

1988 births
Living people
Freestyle skiers at the 2014 Winter Olympics
Russian male freestyle skiers
Olympic freestyle skiers of Russia